In Greek mythology, Eteocles was a king of Thebes, the son of Oedipus and either Jocasta or Euryganeia. Oedipus killed his father Laius and married his mother without knowing his relationship to either. When the relationship was revealed, he was expelled from Thebes.  The rule passed to his sons Eteocles and Polynices.  However, because of a curse from their father, the two brothers did not share the rule peacefully and died as a result, ultimately killing each other in battle for control of the city. Upon his death, Eteocles was succeeded by his uncle, Creon.

Etymology
The name translates as "truly glorious", from  ἐτεός (eteós, “true”) + -κλῆς (-klês < kleos “glory”). It also appears in earlier form *Etewoklewes. Tawagalawas is thought to be the Hittite rendition of the Greek name.

Oedipus's curse
In the Thebaid, the brothers were cursed by their father for their disrespect towards him on two occasions.  The first of these occurred when they served him using the silver table of Cadmus and a golden cup, which he had forbidden.  The brothers then sent him the haunch of a sacrificed animal, rather than the shoulder, which he deserved.  Enraged, Oedipus prayed to Zeus that the brothers would die by each other's hands. However, in Sophocles's Oedipus at Colonus, Oedipus desired to stay in Thebes but was expelled by Creon.  His sons argued over the throne, but Eteocles gained the support of the Thebans and expelled Polynices, who went to Oedipus to ask for his blessing to retake the city, but instead was cursed to die by his brother's hand.

Quarrel over Thebes
There are several accounts of how Eteocles and Polynices shared the rule after Oedipus's departure from the city.  In Hellanicus's account, Eteocles offers his brother his choice of either the rule of the city or a share of the property.  In Pherecydes, however, Eteocles expels Polynices by force, and keeps the rule of Thebes and the inheritance. The Bibliotheca and Diodorus state that the brothers agree to divide the kingship between them, switching each year. Eteocles, however, was allotted the first year, and refused to surrender the crown.

In all of these versions, Polynices gathered the support of the Argives and attacked Thebes, in the war of Seven against Thebes, the subject of Aeschylus' tragedy Seven Against Thebes. Although Eteocles's forces were victorious, the brothers killed each other.

Popular culture
 Eteocles appears in the 1959 film Hercules Unchained, portrayed by Italian actor Sergio Fantoni. The film portrays Eteocles as one of three villains (including his brother Polynices and the film's femme fatale Queen Omphale) whose sadistic nature is demonstrated by his private arena filled with tigers fed human prisoners of war. His madness is also demonstrated by his public execution of Theban prisoners whom he orders thrown from atop the city's main gate as a warning against his brother's opposition. The film follows only the mythology of Eteocles' relation to his father and brother, including his eventual death at the hands of Polynices. The film however, omits any acknowledgement of Creon being the uncle of Eteocles.

Genealogy

See also
Epigoni
The Thebans

Notes

References
Apollodorus, The Library with an English Translation by Sir James George Frazer, F.B.A., F.R.S. in 2 Volumes, Cambridge, MA, Harvard University Press; London, William Heinemann Ltd. 1921. ISBN 0-674-99135-4. Online version at the Perseus Digital Library. Greek text available from the same website.
Gantz, Timothy. Early Greek Myth. Baltimore: Johns Hopkins University Press, 1993.
Hoffner, Beckman. Letters from the Hittite Kingdom. Atlanta: Society of Biblical Literature, 2009.

Theban kings
Characters in Seven against Thebes
Theban characters in Greek mythology